The 2020 Monterrey Challenger was a professional tennis tournament played on hard courts. It was the eleventh edition of the tournament which was part of the 2020 ATP Challenger Tour. It took place in Monterrey, Mexico from 2 to 8 March 2020.

Singles main-draw entrants

Seeds

 1 Rankings are as of 24 February 2020.

Other entrants
The following players received wildcards into the singles main draw:
  Milledge Cossu
  Alex Hernández
  Adrian Mannarino
  Shintaro Mochizuki
  Luis Patiño

The following players received entry from the qualifying draw:
  Liam Caruana
  Carlos Gómez-Herrera

Champions

Singles

  Adrian Mannarino def.  Aleksandar Vukic 6–1, 6–3.

Doubles

  Karol Drzewiecki /  Gonçalo Oliveira def.  Orlando Luz /  Rafael Matos 6–7(5–7), 6–4, [11–9].

References

External links 
 Official website

2020 in Mexican sports
2020 ATP Challenger Tour
March 2020 sports events in Mexico